Marek Perepeczko (3 April 1942 – 17 November 2005) was a popular Polish movie and theatrical actor.
 
Between 1960 and 1961, he appeared in Andrzej Konic's Poetic Studio (Studio Poetyckie Andrzeja Konica) in TVP (Polish Television/Telewizja Polska). Perepeczko graduated from Aleksander Zelwerowicz State Theatre Academy in Warsaw in 1965. He debuted on the stage the same year. Between 1966 and 1969 he appeared on the stage of the Klasyczny (Classical) Theatre 
in Warsaw and between 1970 and 1977 he was a director of Komedia Theatre. In the 80's Marek Perepeczko resided outside Poland and from 1998 he was an actor and director of Teatr Adama Mickiewicza (Adam Mickiewicz Theatre) in Częstochowa. He was married to Agnieszka Fitkau-Perepeczko. Marek Perepeczko was one of the most famous Polish actors. He's most remembered for his roles in Janosik, 13 Posterunek and Kolumbowie.

Filmography 

 Trzeba Gleboko Oddychac, rez. Mira Hamermesh (1964)
 Potem nastąpi cisza (1965)
 Zejście do piekła (1966)
 Wilcze echa (1968)
 Polowanie na muchy (1969)
 Gniewko, syn rybaka, TV series (1968–1970)
 Pan Wołodyjowski (1969)
 Przygody pana Michała, TV series (1969)
 Brzezina (1970)
 Kolumbowie, TV series (1970)
 Przygoda Stasia (1970), as Staś's father
 Motodrama (1971)
 Wesele (1972)
 Janosik, TV series (1973) as Janosik
 Janosik (1974), as Janosik
 Awans (1974)
 Śmierć autostopowiczek (1979)
 13 posterunek, TV series (1997–1998) as Komendant nadkomisarz Władysław Słoik
 Sara (1997)
 Pan Tadeusz (1999)
 13 posterunek 2, TV series (2000) as Komendant nadkomisarz Władysław Słoik
 Atrakcyjny pozna panią... (2004)
 Dublerzy (2005)

References

External links 

1942 births
2005 deaths
Male actors from Warsaw
Polish male film actors
20th-century Polish male actors
Polish male television actors
Polish male stage actors